HVL may refer to:
 Half-value layer, in radiometry
 Hardware verification language, in computer science
 HeavyLift International, a defunct Emirati cargo airline
 Hurstville railway station, in Sydney, Australia
 Hutt Valley Line, a rail line in New Zealand
 Western Norway University of Applied Sciences, the abbreviation derived from its Norwegian name